Upravlyaemy Sputnik Aktivnyy ( for Controlled Active Satellite), or US-A, also known in the west as Radar Ocean Reconnaissance Satellite or RORSAT (GRAU index 17F16K), was a series of 33 Soviet reconnaissance satellites. Launched between 1967 and 1988 to monitor NATO and merchant vessels using radar, the satellites were powered by nuclear reactors.

Because a return signal from an ordinary target illuminated by a radar transmitter diminishes as the inverse of the fourth power of the distance, for the surveillance radar to work effectively, US-A satellites had to be placed in low Earth orbit. Had they used large solar panels for power, the orbit would have rapidly decayed due to drag through the upper atmosphere. Further, the satellite would have been useless in the shadow of Earth. Hence the majority of the satellites carried type BES-5 nuclear reactors fuelled by uranium-235. Normally the nuclear reactor cores were ejected into high orbit (a so-called "disposal orbit") at the end of the mission, but there were several failure incidents, some of which resulted in radioactive material re-entering the Earth's atmosphere.

The US-A programme was responsible for orbiting a total of 33 nuclear reactors, 31 of them BES-5 types with a capacity of providing about two kilowatts of power for the radar unit. In addition, in 1987 the Soviets launched two larger TOPAZ nuclear reactors (six kilowatts) in Kosmos satellites (Kosmos 1818 and Kosmos 1867) which were each capable of operating for six months. The higher-orbiting TOPAZ-containing satellites were the major source of orbital contamination for satellites that sensed gamma-rays for astronomical and security purposes, as radioisotope thermoelectric generators (RTGs) do not generate significant gamma radiation as compared with unshielded satellite fission reactors, and all of the BES-5-containing spacecraft orbited too low to cause positron pollution in the magnetosphere.

The last US-A satellite was launched 14 March 1988.

Incidents
 Launch failure, 25 April 1973. Launch failed and the reactor fell into the Pacific Ocean north of Japan. Radiation was detected by US air sampling airplanes.
 Kosmos 367 (04564 / 1970-079A), 3 October 1970, failed 110 hours after launch, moved to higher orbit.
 Kosmos 954. The satellite failed to boost into a nuclear-safe storage orbit as planned. Nuclear materials re-entered the Earth's atmosphere on 24 January 1978 and left a trail of radioactive pollution over an estimated 124,000 square kilometres of Canada's Northwest Territories.
 Kosmos 1402. Failed to boost into storage orbit in late 1982. The reactor core was separated from the remainder of the spacecraft and was the last piece of the satellite to return to Earth, landing in the South Atlantic Ocean on 7 February 1983.
 Kosmos 1900.

Other concerns 
Although most nuclear cores were successfully ejected into higher orbits, their orbits will still eventually decay.

US-A satellites were a major source of space debris in low Earth orbit. The debris is created two ways:

During 16 reactor core ejections, approximately 128 kg of NaK-78 (a fusible alloy eutectic of 22% and 78% w/w sodium and potassium, respectively) escaped from the primary coolant systems of the BES-5 reactors. The smaller droplets have already decayed/reentered, but larger droplets (up to 5.5 cm in diameter) are still in orbit. Since the metal coolant was exposed to neutron radiation, it contains some radioactive argon-39, with a half-life of 269 years. There is no risk of surface contamination, as the droplets will burn up completely in the upper atmosphere on re-entry and the argon, a chemically inert gas, will dissipate. The major risk is impact with operational satellites.

An additional mechanism is through the impact of space debris hitting intact contained coolant loops.  A number of these old satellites are punctured by orbiting space debris—calculated to be 8 percent over any 50-year period—and release their remaining NaK coolant into space. The coolant self-forms into frozen droplets of solid sodium-potassium of up to around several centimeters in size, and these solid objects then become a significant source of space debris themselves.

See also
 SNAP-10A, an experimental nuclear reactor launched into orbit by the United States
 Space-based radar
 List of Kosmos satellites

References

External links
 Encyclopedia Astronautica article on the US-A RORSAT programme.
 The US-A program and radio observations thereof
 
 

Reconnaissance satellites of the Soviet Union
Space radars
Nuclear power in space
Nuclear technology in the Soviet Union